The Women's Freestyle 59 kg is a competition featured at the 2021 European Wrestling Championships, and was held in Warsaw, Poland on April 21 and April 22.

Medalists

Results 
 Legend
 F — Won by fall

Main Bracket

Repechage

References

External links
Draw

Women's Freestyle 59 kg
2021 in women's sport wrestling